Conogryllus is a monotypic genus of African crickets in tribe Gryllini.

Taxonomy
The genus contains the following species found in the Congo Basin:
Conogryllus testaceus (Chopard, 1934)

References

Gryllinae
Orthoptera genera